Sylvester Turner (born September 27, 1954) is an American attorney and politician who is serving as the 62nd mayor of Houston, Texas. A member of the Democratic Party, Turner was a member of the Texas House of Representatives from 1989 until 2016. He attended the University of Houston and Harvard Law School. Turner ran for mayor of Houston in 1991, losing in the runoff election to Bob Lanier. He lost again in 2003, coming in third and thus missing the runoff.

Turner won the 2015 election, defeating Bill King in the runoff by 4,082 votes out of 212,696 votes cast in the closest mayoral election in Houston history by percentage.

On December 14, 2019, Turner won his second term as mayor over the more conservative Tony Buzbee, 56-44 percent in a turn out of less than 20 percent of registered voters.

Early life
Turner was born on September 27, 1954, in Houston, Texas, as the sixth of nine children, and was raised in the Acres Homes community in northwest Houston by his father, a commercial painter, and his mother, a maid at the Rice Hotel. He was senior class president and valedictorian at Klein High School. At the University of Houston he was Speaker of the Student Senate and graduated magna cum laude with a B.A. degree in political science. Turner was a finalist in the Ames Moot Court Competition while obtaining a J.D. degree from Harvard Law School. He is a member of Alpha Phi Alpha fraternity.

Law practice
Upon completing law school Turner joined the law firm of Fulbright & Jaworski. In 1983, he founded his own firm, Barnes & Turner. He has served as an adjunct professor at the Thurgood Marshall School of Law, and as a seminar lecturer at the South Texas College of Law and the University of Houston Law School's Continuing Legal Education Programs. Turner was admitted to practice in the State of Texas, federal District Court for the Southern District Court of Texas and the Fifth Circuit Court of Appeals. He is a member of the State Bar of Texas, American Bar Association, National Bar Association, Houston Lawyers Association, and the Houston Bar Association. Turner served as an immigration lawyer for many years in Houston.

Political career
In 1984, Turner ran for Harris County Commissioner, Precinct 1 in the Democratic primary, but lost to El Franco Lee. Four years later, he was elected to the Texas House of Representatives in House District 139 in Harris County and remained in office through 2014. During that time, Turner ran unsuccessfully for mayor of Houston in 1991 and 2003.

During his 1991 campaign for Houston mayor, Wayne Dolcefino of KTRK-TV ran an investigative report questioning Turner's involvement in an elaborate insurance fraud scam. The resulting scandal ultimately cost Turner the election. Turner sued Dolcefino and KTRK and was initially awarded a $5.5 million libel settlement that was reduced to $3.25 million by the presiding judge. KTRK appealed the ruling. The Texas Supreme Court overturned the money award on the basis of heightened legal protections which the First Amendment affords to the media. But the court found that both of these specific broadcasts were both false and defamatory.

Turner served more than 25 years in the Texas House of Representatives, and over the course of his service, he served as a member of the Legislative Budget Board, Vice-Chairman of the House Appropriations Committee, Chairman of the Subcommittee of Articles 1, 4 & 5 (General Government, Judiciary, Public Safety & Criminal Justice) and the House State Affairs Committee. He also chaired the Texas Legislative Black Caucus and the Greater Houston Area Legislative Delegation. Turner has supported policies to attract doctors to underserved areas, proposed a measure increasing state funding for mental health services in Harris County from $32 million to $200 million, and worked to increase funds for legal aid for poor Texans.

In February 2020, Turner endorsed Michael Bloomberg in the 2020 Democratic Party presidential primaries. However, in March 2020, he switched his endorsement to former vice president Joe Biden.

Ride sharing mobile apps
In 2016, Turner voiced his support for laws regulating Uber and other ridesharing services to protect public safety.

LGBT rights
In 2015, Turner was named one of the top 10 best members of the Texas House on LGBT issues by Equality Texas with an "A+" rating, after Turner said he had "evolved" on LGBT issues.

Turner, while running against Bill King in the 2015 Houston mayoral runoff election, stated he is "100 percent" committed to reenacting Houston Equal Rights Ordinance (HERO) and attacked Bill King for saying he won't revisit the issue of HERO, along with his support from the Campaign for Houston.

Consumer protections

In 1999, Turner voted to restructure the electric utility industry in Texas to allow customers competition and consumer choice. During his time in the legislature, he has also worked to continue to protect Texans, voting for bills preventing gas companies from cutting off service during freezing temperatures, limiting the amount utility companies could raise rates in order to fund certain projects, such as building electric poles and wires, without first getting approval from state regulators, and authoring legislation that required the Public Utility Commission to conduct cost-benefit analyses of any proposals from utility companies that would add more than $100 million to annual consumer electricity costs. During the 84th session, Turner authored legislation that would prohibit electricity companies from charging customers "minimum usage fees" when they used too little electricity. Turner also voted to allow the Public Utility Commission to issue emergency cease-and-desist orders, without first going to a court, to companies whose actions threaten the state's electricity supply. During the 83rd session, he joined a campaign to encourage low-income Texans to enroll in "LITE-UP Texas", a program "authorized by the Texas Legislature through which participants could reduce the monthly cost of electric service by 82%." In the 84th session, he authored a bill to extend this discount program for another two years, until the end of 2017. He also co-authored a bill to help ensure persons living in multi-family residences are alerted when their electricity bill has not been paid.

Public education
In 2004, he voted against a measure that would have scaled "back benefits for future public school employees and discourag[ed] early retirement." He was also critical of investment managers for the Teachers Retirement Fund for taking over $8.2 million in bonuses while the state was slashing funding for education and the system's investments continued to struggle. In 2011, Turner voted against a measure that would have implemented a 6 percent cut to education funding for all schools in Texas, a move that equated to a $4 billion education funding cut. As a member of the legislature, Turner voted against a measure that would allow school districts to lower their salaries, implement furlough days, and increase student-teacher classroom ratios. He also opposed a corporate tax break that many legislators, in the Texas House of Representatives, believed would hurt public school funding.

Immigration
Texas has banned sanctuary cities, but Mayor Turner said that Houston will not assist ICE agents with immigration raids.

Hurricane Harvey
In the aftermath of Hurricane Harvey, Mayor Turner has received criticism for his decision not to suggest any form of evacuation.  He has responded to the criticism by pointing out the logistics of evacuating "6.5 million" people and the deaths and traffic that occurred during the 2005 Hurricane Rita evacuation.  Critics have replied stating that 6.5 million people did not have to be evacuated but instead tens of thousands could have been evacuated who were in flood zones or individuals who were most at risk during emergencies could have been evacuated.

Health care
A supporter of the federal Affordable Care Act (ACA), Turner voted against joining the Interstate Health Care Compact, an alternative to traditional ACA participation, and introduced legislation that would expand Medicaid in Texas pursuant to the ACA. Turner warned fellow legislators about the potential backlash from constituents if the state chose not to expand Medicaid, which promised a significant return on the state's investment. One of his major accomplishments in the House was legislation that expanded access to the children's health insurance program, which was passed in 2007. Turner also passed legislation in 2015 that will free up funding for medical trauma care centers, which have not received the full amount of funds designated to be spent specifically on trauma centers. The legislation will bring $25 million to the Greater Houston area over the next two years, including $11 million to Ben Taub and $10 million to the Memorial Hermann. During the 84th Legislature, Turner introduced legislation that would provide care under Medicaid for people with severe and persistent mental illness and who are transitioning from an institution to the community, and who are at risk of institutionalization or re-institutionalization.

Turner is a regular attendee of various public health programs, including contributions to Covid-19 safety and community-based health care.

Abortion
Sylvester Turner has long been an advocate for abortion rights. He voted against a measure requiring doctors to perform a sonogram on women seeking an abortion at least 24 hours before the procedures. He has also fought to protect funding for family planning programs and Planned Parenthood. Turner also voted against a Senate version of a measure that banned abortions after 20 weeks and tightened standards on abortion clinics, and also authored an amendment to the bill that would have required the state to pay the costs abortion clinics would incur on the measure to retrofit facilities so they could be certified as surgical centers. In 2013, the El Paso Times described Turner as a "lion of pro-abortion rights."

Criminal justice
On gun control, Turner opposed measures to limit lawsuits against gun or ammunition manufacturers, allowing concealed handguns on higher education campuses, and rescinding the authority of local governments to ban concealed weapons on public property. He also opposed measures that would reduce the number of training hours required to receive a concealed handgun license. Turner supported a bill that prohibited the use of state funds for the enforcement of federal firearms regulations. He also advocated abandoning the "pick-a-pal system", where judges appoint commissioners who then can pick whoever they want to serve on grand juries.

Homelessness
As mayor of Houston, Turner has made it a goal of his administration to end chronic homelessness in the city.

Personal life
Turner is a member of the Church Without Walls. He was married to Cheryl Turner from 1983 to 1991, and they have one daughter, Ashley Paige Turner.

In November 2022, Turner disclosed that during the summer he had been diagnosed with bone cancer, for which he had surgery and received six weeks of radiation treatment.

See also
 List of mayors of the 50 largest cities in the United States

References

External links

 
Legislative page
Our Candidates page

20th-century American lawyers
20th-century American politicians
21st-century American lawyers
21st-century American politicians
1954 births
African-American mayors in Texas
African-American state legislators in Texas
Living people
Mayors of Houston
Democratic Party members of the Texas House of Representatives
Harvard Law School alumni
South Texas College of Law faculty
Texas lawyers
University of Houston alumni
University of Houston faculty
Baptists from Texas
Klein High School alumni
20th-century African-American politicians
21st-century African-American politicians